The 2013–14 OK Liga Femenina was the sixth edition of Spain's premier women's rink hockey championship.

CP Voltregà won its fourth title in a row.

Teams

League table

Copa de la Reina

The 2014 Copa de la Reina was the 9th edition of the Spanish women's roller hockey cup. It was played in Lloret de Mar between the four first qualified teams after the first half of the season.

Voltregà won its fifth title ever after beating Manlleu by 3–1 in the final.

References

External links
RFEP official website

2013 in roller hockey
2014 in roller hockey
OK Liga Femenina seasons